Alex Borteh is a professional poker player who won a World Series of Poker bracelet in a World Series of Poker event, the $3,000 Limit Hold'em event. Borteh has cashed in four WSOP events and made two final tables.  In 2005, he finished in 3rd place in the $1,500 Limit Hold'em Shootout event.  Borteh prefers limit hold'em to no-limit hold'em, considering the former a game that requires more skill.

Before becoming a poker player, Borteh finished second at the 2001 World Championship for Magic: The Gathering  This was the tournament in which fellow bracelet winner David Williams was disqualified because of marked cards.

Borteh graduated from Olentangy High School, which is in Lewis Center, Ohio, in 2001. He earned a degree in Philosophy from Ohio State University.

As of 2008, his live tournament winnings exceed $320,000.

World Series of Poker bracelets

References

External links 
 Hendon Mob tournament results Alexander Borteh

American poker players
World Series of Poker bracelet winners
American Magic: The Gathering players
Living people
People from Lewis Center, Ohio
Year of birth missing (living people)